Erna Hanfstaengl (October 31, 1885May 6, 1981), was the elder sister of Ernst ("Putzi") Hanfstaengl and was an acquaintance of Adolf Hitler. She also befriended Unity Mitford, who lived with Erna for a period.

Romantic involvement with Hitler
Hitler may have been romantically involved with Erna, who was reported to have been beautiful, charming, cultured and intelligent. In the days following the failed Beer Hall Putsch, it was rumored that Hitler and Erna had sex while the former was hiding at a country house in Uffing.

Rumors circulated in Munich in 1923 that Hitler and Erna were to be engaged; in the spring of 1923, the most widely read newspaper in Munich, the Münchner Neueste Nachrichten, published a story to this effect.

It appears that the "tall and stately" Erna had simply been polite to Hitler and had shown courtesy to her brother's friend at their initial meeting in the early 1920s, and Hitler misinterpreted this as romantic affection. Gross claims that Hitler was in love with Erna, but that she considered the whole business to be a joke, and that she was amused at his attempts to court her. According to Gross, she was teased by her society friends about the unwanted affections shown by her "suitor" and made sure that she was never alone with him.

In any event it appears that during the period 1922-23, Erna assisted her brother in his aspirations to become one of Hitler's inner circle, by furthering Hitler's introduction to people of wealth and social standing in Munich.

Several writers claim that, years later, Geli Raubal, Hitler's niece (and possibly his lover for a period, although many authorities doubt their relationship was consummated) was jealous of Hitler's association with Erna.

Plot against Hitler
According to Heinrich Himmler's personal aide and special-plenipotentiary Walter Schellenberg, Erna was also involved in a plot to overthrow Hitler and to sue for peace with the Allies.

Erna owned a shop in Munich in 1943, and Schellenberg made her acquaintance in March 1943 at Himmler's suggestion. Himmler's wife and Erna were acquainted, and Frau Himmler had suggested to her husband that Erna would be a suitable person to conduct peace negotiations with the English, perhaps because she knew "people of influence" such as Randolph Churchill.

Her peace plan consisted of having Himmler (with the aid of the Waffen SS) abduct Hitler to the Obersalzberg, where he would be held in SS detention. This would allow for the use of the cover story that Hitler was still in control of the government, since he spent much time at Obersalzberg anyway. A Council of Twelve would then constitute the de facto government, with Himmler at the head. Erna would then open an art shop in Paris and proceed to open secret negotiations with persons of influence in England, such as Randolph Churchill, whom she claimed to know.

Erna traveled to Paris twice in support of this plan and made contacts, including a former commandant of the French police. Schellenberg and Erna met several times during 1943. He advanced her 500,000 French francs to establish her art-shop cover in Paris, which she did. Nothing, however, came of the plot, and Schellenberg claimed that he himself would not have engaged an agent such as Erna Hanfstaengl, save for the insistence of Himmler.

In May 1944, at Himmler's direction, Schellenberg ceased any further usage of Erna Hanfstaengl as a possible agent for peace negotiations. Schellenberg reportedly objected to her termination as an agent and argued with Himmler for a half-hour over the decision, but to no avail.

References

1885 births
1981 deaths
Adolf Hitler
People from Munich
People from the Kingdom of Bavaria
Attempted coups in Germany